Calodendrum is a genus of medium-sized evergreen trees comprising two species from Africa. Calodendrum capense, the Cape chestnut, is a well known tree that is widely cultivated, while Calodendrum eickii is a rare forest tree from Tanzania. The botanical name comes from Greek, kalos means beautiful and dendrum means tree. Both species are harvested for their timber in Africa.

References

IUCN Red List of Threatened Species: Calodendrum eickii
Lord, Tony (2003) Flora : The Gardener's Bible : More than 20,000 garden plants from around the world. London: Cassell.  
Macoboy, Stirling (1979) What Tree is That?, Sydney, Australia (1st ed.: Sydney: Ure Smith). 

Zanthoxyloideae
Zanthoxyloideae genera